General Ahmed Jimale Gedi, also known as Ahmed Jimale Gedi Irfid, is a Somali military general.

References

Living people
Somalian generals
Year of birth missing (living people)